The Manikins were an Australian punk rock and new wave band from Perth, Western Australia.

History
The band formed in August 1976 as the Cheap Nasties. Their debut gig was at The Rivervale Hotel in mid-1977. They lay claim to the title of Perth's first punk band. The original Cheap Nasties' lineup was Kim Salmon (guitar/vocals), Neil Fernandes (guitar/vocals), Ken Seymour (bass/vocals) and Mark Betts (drums). Salmon left the Cheap Nasties in December 1977, to form The Scientists.

The rest of the band, with Robbie Porritt joining as lead vocalist, continued as The Manikins.  The raw sound of the Cheap Nasties gradually gave way to a poppier, new wave-oriented musical direction.

Dave Faulkner, ex-The Victims, joined for a brief period as keyboard player (1979–1980). He would later be a founding member and the mainstay of the Hoodoo Gurus. Seymour also left, to be replaced by Dan Dare.

The band had several residencies in Perth, in particular Wednesday nights at the Broadway Tavern in Nedlands and the nightclub Hernando's Hideaway.  The band relocated to Melbourne in the early 1980s, but broke up soon afterwards in 1981.

Later in 1986 Mark Betts registered the Manikins name and formed a new version of the band with a female vocalist, Christine Bodey and releasing new romantic synth style recordings between 1986 and 1988.

In 2004 Kim Salmon was inducted into the West Australian Music Industry Association Hall of Fame. In 2007 Salmon was inducted into the Music Victoria Awards Hall of Fame.

Discography

Cheap Nasties

Singles
 "I Never Thought I'd Find Someone Who Would Be So Kind"/"Radio World" - Independent (7") (SMX-46904) (November, 1978)
 "Premonition"/"Laugh Too Loud" - Independent (7") (SMX-46969) (August, 1979)
 "Love at Second Sight"/"Nuisance"/"All I Care About" - Independent (7") (SMX-55051) (October, 1980)

Albums
Live Locally - Inner City Sound (cassette) (1979)
Last Gasp - Inner City Sound (cassette) (1981)
The Manikins - Two Tribes Records (compilation CD) (2004)

Manikins

Singles
"What Are You On?"/"Dictator's Dream" (July, 1986)
"Cruel World"/"Dracula's Slut" (November, 1987) #52
"Scent"/"Life Underground" (May, 1988)

Albums
Manikins (February, 1988)

References

External links
"Kim Salmon's Perspective on the Early Perth Punk Era"
Citadel Records, "The Manikins"
"Manikins"
"The Manikins"
Music Council of Australia Annual Address (2006) - Neil Fernandes

Musical groups established in 1976
Musical groups disestablished in 1981
Musical groups from Perth, Western Australia
Australian punk rock groups
Australian new wave musical groups